Dolinsky (masculine), Dolinská (Czech and Slovak feminine), Dolinskaya (Belarusian and Russian feminine), or Dolinskoye (neuter) may refer to:

People
 Ján Valašťan Dolinský (1892–1965), Slovak author
 John Dolinsky (born 1954), German-American soccer player
 Meyer Dolinsky (1923–1984), aka Mike Dolinsky, American writer, actor, and stunt coordinator
 Milan Dolinský (born 1935), Slovak footballer

Places 
Dolinsky District, a district of Sakhalin Oblast, Russia
Dolinsky Urban Okrug, the municipal formation which it is incorporated as
Dolinsky (inhabited locality) (Dolinskaya, Dolinskoye), name of several rural localities in Russia
Dolynske (disambiguation) (Dolinskoye), a few populated settlements in Ukraine

See also
 
 Doliński, a surname